The 2001–02 season is Hyderabad cricket team's 68th competitive season. The Hyderabad cricket team is senior men's domestic cricket team based in the city of Hyderabad, India, run by the Hyderabad Cricket Association. They represent the region of Telangana in the state of Andhra Pradesh in domestic competitions.

Competition Overview

Squads
 Head Coach: Arshad Ayub

 Irani Cup
Laxman got selected to the Rest of India squad for the 2001 Irani Cup, a first-class cricket competition in India.

NKP Salve Challenger Trophy
Laxman and Manohar got picked to the India A squad while Arjun got picked to the India B squad for the 2001-02 NKP Salve Challenger Trophy, a List-A cricket tournament in India.

Deodhar Trophy
Manohar, Vinay Kumar and Arjun got selected to the South Zone squad for the 2001-02 Deodhar Trophy, a List-A cricket competition in India.

Duleep Trophy
Nand Kishore, Vinay Kumar and Arjun got selected to the South Zone squad for the 2001-02 Duleep Trophy, a first-class cricket tournament in India.

Ranji Trophy

The Hyderabad team, led by Venkatapathy Raju, began their campaign in the Ranji Trophy, the premier first-class cricket tournament in India, with a draw against the Karnataka at Hyderabad on 21 November 2001. They finished inside top-3 in the South Zone to advance to the knockout stage with a win and four draws. They were eliminated in the quarter-finals where the Baroda defeated the Hyderabad by an innings and 256 runs.

Points Table
South Zone

  Top three teams advanced to the knockout stage.
 Points system : Win = 8, Draw with first innings lead = 5, No Result = 3, Draw with first innings deficit = 3, Loss = 0.

Knockout stage

Matches
Zonal Stage

Prequarter-final

Quarter-final

Statistics
Most runs

 Source: Cricinfo
Most wickets

 Source: Cricinfo

Ranji One–Day Trophy
The Hyderabad team, led by Venkatapathy Raju, began their campaign in the Subbaiah Pillai Trophy as part of the South Zone Ranji One–Day Trophy, a List-A cricket tournament in India, with a win against the Andhra at Visakhapatnam on 3 January 2002. The Andhra posted 265 with the help of the half-centuries from Yalaka Venugopal Rao and Prasad Reddy but the good second wicket partnership between Nand Kishore and Devishetty Vinay Kumar along with the swift lower order batting ensured the Hyderabad chase the target with two-wickets to spare. In the second match, the century from J. Arunkumar and the half-century from Vijay Bharadwaj helped the Karnataka post 336. Though the Hyderabad started the chase strongly scoring 140 in 20 overs, middle-order collapse led to the Hyderabad bowl out to 252 despite Vinay Kumar's run-a-ball century. The partnership of 124 runs between Ajay Kudva and Suresh Kumar helped the Kerala post 273 but the half-centuries from Anirudh Singh and Gangashetty Arvind Kumar helped the Hyderabad chase the target with two-wickets to spare in their third match of the tournament. In the fourth match, the Hyderabad batsmen collapsed as none of them could get big score apart from the half-century from Nand Kishore which helped them to recover to 212 but the half-centuries from Jayaraman Madanagopal and Somasetty Suresh helped the Tamil Nadu chase the target with four-wickets to spare. In the final zonal match, 196-run partnership from Ambati Rayudu and Vinay Kumar with both scoring the centuries along with the half-century from Anirudh helped the Hyderabad post 338. In reply, the Goa batsmen were troubled barring the half-century from the opener, Sagun Kamat as the four-wicket haul from Inder Shekar Reddy led to a middle-order collapse for the Goa and ensured a 159-run win for the Hyderabad. Despite the win in the last zonal match, the Hyderabad finished third in the South Zone with three wins and two losses.

Points Table
South Zone

  Top team qualified for the 2002–03 Wills Trophy.

Matches
Zonal Stage

Statistics
Most runs

 Source: Cricinfo
Most wickets

 Source: Cricinfo

See also
 Hyderabad cricket team
 Hyderabad Cricket Association

References

External links
Hyderabad cricket team official site

Cricket in Hyderabad, India
Cricket in Telangana
Sport in Telangana